The Barbican Muse is a sculpture of a woman, holding tragedy and comedy masks, by Matthew Spender, and was installed on a wall near the Silk Street entrance to the Barbican Centre in the City of London, England, in 1994.

It was commissioned, in 1993, by architect Theo Crosby to 'float, glow and point the way' to visitors arriving at the centre on the walkway from Moorgate Station.

As part of the 1993–1994 refurbishment, Crosby also commissioned nine gilded fibreglass muses by British sculptor Sir Bernard Sindall, but these were removed in April 1997, and sold to Dick Enthoven in 1998.

References

External links 

1994 establishments in the United Kingdom
1994 sculptures
Fiberglass sculptures in the United Kingdom
Sculptures in London
Barbican Estate